KHMZ may refer to:

 KHMZ (FM), a radio station (94.9 FM) licensed to serve Snyder, Texas, United States
 Bedford County Airport (ICAO code KHMZ)